Q76 may refer to:
 Q76 (New York City bus)
 Al-Insan